Berne (or Bern) Convention may refer to:

 Berne Convention for the Protection of Literary and Artistic Works
 Berne Convention on the Conservation of European Wildlife and Natural Habitats (Council of Europe), on nature conservation in Europe
 The Treaty of Bern, establishing the General Postal Union
 Berne Convention (1906) on the prohibition of white phosphorus in the manufacture of matches.